Jawaharlal Nehru Architecture and Fine Arts University (JNAFAU), is an architecture and fine arts university located at Masab Tank, Hyderabad, Telangana, India. JNAFAU has two colleges which offer several undergraduate, postgraduate and PhD research programs, with an emphasis of two different colleges: School Of Planning & Architecture and College of Fine Arts. It was established by the erstwhile Hyderabad State in 1940, as the "College of Fine Arts".

In School Of Planning & Architecture offers courses such as  Architecture, Digital Techniques for Design & Planning, Facilities and Services Planning, Interior Designing, Planning, etc. in School of planning and Architecture.

In College of Fine Arts courses such as painting, Applied Arts, Photography, Animation, Sculpture, etc., are offered.

History
The University has its roots in College of Fine Arts, which started as a 'School  of Arts and Crafts' to promote arts and local crafts, the College has  gradually grown in stature as the "Government College of Arts and  Architecture" under the management of the Department of Technical  Education, Government of Telangana, Hyderabad.

With  the establishment of Jawaharlal Nehru Technological University in Oct.  1972, the College merged with the university and became a Constituent  College of the JNT University. The Jawaharlal Nehru Technological University has been bifurcated and  divided into four different universities, such as JNTU Anantapur, JNTU Kakinada, JNTU Hyderabad, & JNAFAU,  Hyderabad established under A.P. Legislature Act No.31 of 2008 as per the above act, the JNTU College of Fine Arts, has become one of  the Constituent College of newly firmed Jawaharlal Nehru Architecture  & Fine Arts University, Masab Tank, Hyderabad w.e.f. 2008-09.

Affiliated institutions

Following educational institutions are affiliated the JNAFAU:
 Annapurna International College of Film & Media, Hyderabad
 ICAT Design & Media College, Hyderabad
 Creative Multimedia College of Fine Arts, Hyderabad
 C.S.I. Institute of Technology, Secunderabad
 S.A.R. College of Architecture, Agiripally
 Sri Venkateshwara College of Architecture, Hyderabad
 Maestro school of planning and architecture, Hyderabad
 Vaishnavi School of Architecture and Planning, Hyderabad
 Masterji College of Architecture, Vijayawada, Andhra Pradesh
 Deccan School of Planning & Architecture, Hyderabad
 Varaha College of Architecture & Planning, Visakhapatnam
 School of Architecture & Planning, Jawaharlal Nehru Institute of Advanced Studies, Secunderabad.
 J.B.R. Architecture College, Hyderabad
 Lumbini School of Architecture & Town Planning, Nalgonda, Telangana
 Aurora's Design Academy, Hyderabad
 Jawaharlal Nehru Institute of Advanced Studies, School of Architecture & Planning, Hyderabad
 Aurora Design Academy, Hyderabad
 Aurora's Design Institute, Hyderbad
 Ashoka School of Planning and Architecture, Hyderabad 
 Woxsen School of Arts & Design, Hyderabad
 Telangana Tribal Welfare Residential Fine Arts Academy for Women, Rajanna Siricilla District, Telangana
 St. Mary’s Visual Arts & Design Degree College, Sanga Reddy District, Telangana

See also 
Education in India
Literacy in India
List of institutions of higher education in Telangana

References

External links
JNAFAU, Official website
jntu world
jntu world

Universities in Hyderabad, India
Architecture schools in India
Art schools in India
2008 establishments in Andhra Pradesh
Educational institutions established in 2008
State universities in Telangana